Mackenzie Grace Allessie (born March 6, 2001) is an American field hockey player.

Personal life
Allessie was born in Mount Joy, Pennsylvania. She began playing hockey in 2008 at just seven years old.

Allessie is a former student of Donegal High School. During her school hockey career, Allessie scored a record 331 goals in the National Federation of High Schools.

Career

Junior National Team
Allessie has been a member of the United States junior teams since 2016, when she was just 15 years of age.

Senior National Team
Allessie was first raised into the senior national team in 2019, following standout performances in the junior national team.

In January 2019, Allessie made her senior international debut during a test series against Chile.

Since her debut Allessie has been a regular inclusion in the United States team, most recently appearing in the 2019 FIH Pro League.

International Goals

References

Living people
2001 births
American female field hockey players
Sportspeople from Pennsylvania
People from Mount Joy, Pennsylvania
Pan American Games bronze medalists for the United States
Field hockey players at the 2019 Pan American Games
Pan American Games medalists in field hockey
Medalists at the 2019 Pan American Games
21st-century American women